Liberty is a borough in Allegheny County, Pennsylvania, United States. The population was 2,355 at the 2020 census.

The mayor of Liberty is currently Jane Weigand.

Liberty does not have its own post office.  The zip code is 15133, and mail is addressed to the city of McKeesport.  Liberty is part of the South Allegheny School District, along with Glassport, Lincoln, and Port Vue, and is home to the district's high school and early childhood center.  Liberty was at one time part of Port Vue but gained its "liberty" from Port Vue in 1912, thus the origin of the name of the town.

Locals tend to refer to the town as "Liberty Borough" or "Liberty Boro," rather than just as "Liberty."

Geography
Liberty is located at  (40.326302, -79.856101). It is bounded by Port Vue and McKeesport to the north, Versailles and the Youghiogheny River to the east, Lincoln to the south, and Glassport to the west.

Government and politics

Education
Liberty Borough is served by the South Allegheny School District.

Demographics

As of the census of 2000, there were 2,670 people, 1,125 households, and 768 families residing in the borough. The population density was 1,856.7 people per square mile (715.9/km2). There were 1,162 housing units at an average density of 808.1/sq mi (311.6/km2). The racial makeup of the borough was 97.98% White, 1.46% African American, 0.11% Native American, 0.11% Asian, 0.04% Pacific Islander, and 0.30% from two or more races. Hispanic or Latino of any race were 0.37% of the population.

There were 1,125 households, out of which 27.0% had children under the age of 18 living with them, 53.2% were married couples living together, 12.1% had a female householder with no husband present, and 31.7% were non-families. 28.5% of all households were made up of individuals, and 16.1% had someone living alone who was 65 years of age or older. The average household size was 2.35 and the average family size was 2.89.

In the borough the population was spread out, with 20.1% under the age of 18, 6.7% from 18 to 24, 26.6% from 25 to 44, 25.3% from 45 to 64, and 21.2% who were 65 years of age or older. The median age was 43 years. For every 100 females there were 88.7 males. For every 100 females age 18 and over, there were 84.3 males.

The median income for a household in the borough was $35,264, and the median income for a family was $42,857. Males had a median income of $35,685 versus $22,304 for females. The per capita income for the borough was $19,491. About 5.6% of families and 7.6% of the population were below the poverty line, including 11.8% of those under age 18 and 5.3% of those age 65 or over.

References

Populated places established in 1912
Boroughs in Allegheny County, Pennsylvania
1912 establishments in Pennsylvania